The 1926 Argentine Primera División was the 35th season of top-flight football in Argentina. The AFA championship began on April 18 and ended on January 16, 1927. The AAm season began on April 4 and ended on November 21.

All Boys, Colegiales, El Porvenir, Nueva Chicago, Sportivo Barracas and Temperley moved to rival league Asociación Amateurs when most of fixtures had been disputed. Teams promoted where Sportivo Balcarce (AFA) and Talleres (RE) (AAm).

Boca Juniors won its 5th. league title (AFA) while Independiente obtained the AAm championship, achieving the 2nd. title for the club.

At the end of the season, Alvear, Argentino de Banfield, Boca Alumni, Del Plata, General San Martín, Palermo, Progresista, Sportivo Balcarce, Sportivo Dock Sud, Sportsman and Universal were relegated when the associations merged.

Final tables

Asociación Argentina de Football - Copa Campeonato

Asociación Amateurs de Football

References

Argentine Primera División seasons
1926 in Argentine football
1926 in South American football